Moorebank High School (MHS) is a government-funded co-educational partially academically selective secondary day school, located in Chipping Norton, a suburb in the Liverpool district of Sydney, New South Wales, Australia. The school was located in Moorebank until suburb borders changed.

Established in 1971 and operated by the New South Wales Department of Education, the school currently caters for approximately 1,041 students from Year 7 to Year 12. This is a comprehensive and selective high school.

History 
Planning for Moorebank High School began in 1971 to meet the needs of the Moorebank,  and  growth areas. It wasn't until May 1975 however that the school was ready to be occupied. At the beginning of term, two staff and students moved into the present school premises, with B. T. O'Donnell as the founding School Principal. In June 1985, to coincide with the opening of the school tennis courts, the school was officially opened by the then Minister of Education, Rodney Cavalier.

Over the years Moorebank High has built up a record of academic, sporting, performing arts and student leadership achievement. The school is a leader in the area of technology with five computing laboratories allowing learning programs to be developed for students. School musicals and Expo evenings are a feature of the school. In 2010 Moorebank High School became a partially selective high school.

Admissions and enrolment 
Total enrolment in junior years (7–10) is approximately 180 students, and around 200 in senior years (11–12). Total number of enrolment was 1,075 students in 2018.

The school is partially selective, meaning it is divided into selective and comprehensive classes. Those who want to enrol in the comprehensive classes will just enrol normally, like in most other high schools.

Admission into selective classes in Year 7 is determined upon results in a Statewide examination known as the Selective High Schools Test. Entry into vacant places in later stages is based on a reserve list and other criteria, mainly reports from previous years. The school also has a Support Unit through which students with Autism Spectrum Disorder receive extra support and lessons designed to equip them for active participation in the wider community upon graduation. These students are also encouraged to take part in all aspects of school life and are an integral part of the school community.

Facilities
School facilities include six laboratories, three industrial kitchens, two wood-work studios, two metal-work studios, a recording studio, a photographic darkroom, a dual-library, a football field, a cricket field, two cricket nets, two basketball courts, three tennis courts, a dance studio, and an indoor multiplex hall with staging.

See also 

 List of government schools in New South Wales
 List of selective high schools in New South Wales

References 

Educational institutions established in 1971
1971 establishments in Australia
Public high schools in Sydney
Selective schools in New South Wales
City of Liverpool (New South Wales)